Instant Classic is an American barbershop quartet from Indianapolis, Indiana. Its members are David Zimmerman, Theo Hicks, Kohl Kitzmiller, and Kyle Kitzmiller.

The quartet won the International Quartet Championship in 2015 at the Barbershop Harmony Society's annual international convention, in Pittsburgh, Pennsylvania.

Discography
Instant Classic (CD; 2014)
Instant Classic: Start of Something Big (CD; 2016)
Instant Classic: Simple Gifts (CD; 2019)
Instant Classic: An Icy Holiday EP (Recording; 2020)

References

External links
 AIC entry

Barbershop Harmony Society
Barbershop quartets